Iridovirus dwarf gourami disease is a widespread consequence caused by the poor genetics of the dwarf gourami, a popular fish in the aquarium trade. It is the result of severe inbreeding. Despite being unable to develop the disease, other gourami become prone to infection if a dwarf gourami in the tank gets the Iridovirus. Once symptoms develop, the gourami's mortality rate reaches 100% and there is no cure nor treatment.

References

Fish viral diseases